Needles Station Hospital was US army Hospital built to support the training at the camps of the vast World War II Desert Training Center. Needles Station Hospital was located in the City of Needles, California in San Bernardino County, California. The main headquarters for the Desert Training Center was Camp Young were General Patton's 3rd Armored Division was stationed. Needles Station Hospital was on 875 acres of land and was open from 1942 to 1943. The hospital had two 250 bed hospital units. The hospital and camp was built using temporary buildings. Due to a shortage of manpower, Prisoner of War at the Hospital Camp volunteered to work at the hospital.  The land was transferred back to the Department of the Interior on December 16, 1944. The site today is a mix of open land and housing. The Federal Property ID number is J09CA0507.

See also
California Historical Landmarks in San Bernardino County, California
California Historical Landmarks in Riverside County, California
Camp Coxcomb
Camp Granite
Camp Iron Mountain
Camp Clipper and Camp Essex
Camp Coxcomb
California during World War II

References

Needles Station Hospital - WW2
California Historical Landmarks
1942 establishments in California
Military in San Bernardino County, California
Military hospitals in the United States
Defunct hospitals in California